Club Atlético Talleres ((lit. Workshops Athletic Club) mostly known simply as Talleres  (lit. Workshops)  or Talleres de Córdoba ) (Córdoba Workshops) is an Argentine sports club from the city of Córdoba. The institution is mostly known for its football team, which currently plays in the Argentine Primera División. Talleres' main rival is Belgrano: Their rivalry is known as "el clásico cordobés".

In field hockey, the club is affiliated to amateur Córdoba Field Hockey Federation, where its teams compete.

History

The club was founded in 1913 as "Atlético Talleres Central Córdoba" by workers of the Córdoba Central Railway, with support from the company. Apart from Atlético Talleres, one of the clubs affiliated to "Federación Cordobesa de Fútbol" (Córdoba Football Federation) was Olimpo, formed by young players participating in second and third divisions.

In 1913 Olimpo was expelled after their players were involved in a riot in disagreement with some referee decisions. After Olimpo beat Atlético Talleres in a friendly match, the club executives encouraged the merger of both clubs with the aim of adding Olimpo players to their team. In 1914, the merger was fulfilled keeping the name "Talleres Central Córdoba". In 1914 Talleres joined the Córdoba local league.

Under this name, Talleres Central Córdoba won the 1915 and 1916 championships. The following year the club was forced to change its name after some incidents in a match that caused player Horacio Salvatelli to be arrested. When some days later Talleres did not allow its players to a local combined, the body expelled the club from the league. Nevertheless, Talleres would rejoined the league in 1918 under the condition to change its name so the club was registered as "Club Atlético Talleres", also winning the championship that same year. Apart from its name, Talleres had to modify the date of foundation (to 12 October 1913) to register as a legal entity.

In 1931 the club was given a land in "Barrio Jardín" to build its own stadium. The project was carried out by engineers Allende Posse and Agenor Villagra, at a cost of $70,000. The stadium was inaugurated on October 12, 1931, with a friendly match between Talleres and Uruguayan side Rampla Juniors. The stadium would be refurbished in 1951 to host a maximum of 18,000 spectators.

In 1969 the team played for the first time in the Argentine Primera División in the Nacional Championship. During the 1970s, the heyday of the Córdoba local league in the national scene, they participated several times in the Nacional championship, in 1976 Luis Ludueña was the championship top scorer with 12 goals, in the 1977 Nacional Championship Talleres finished in second place, losing to Independiente the finals on the away goals rule, and in 1978 José Reinaldi scored 18 goals and was the championship top scorer. Talleres contributed three players to the Argentine squad that won the 1978 FIFA World Cup, with Talleres' captain Luis Galván as a starter in the final as a center back. Miguel Oviedo and Jose Daniel Valencia were substitutes. The '78 WC team featured several other prominent players that got their start in the golden era of the Córdoba local league, such as Mario Kempes and Osvaldo Ardiles, both at Instituto Atletico Central Cordoba in the early-1970s.

Starting in 1980, Talleres became a regular of the Metropolitano championship and finished in third place.

Talleres played in the Argentine Primera División until the 1993 Torneo Clausura when Talleres was relegated to the Primera B Nacional. Talleres was promoted to Argentine Primera División after the 1993–94 championship, but was again related after a poor performance in 1994–95 season. The following season, the club finished first during the Clausura tournament of the Second Division but lost the Championship to Huracán de Corrientes.

In 1998, during a game (later remembered by fans as "The Final of the Century," Talleres won its first Argentine title, the 1997/98 Primera B Nacional championship on penalty kick shootout against all-time rival Belgrano de Córdoba, earning them a promotion to the First Division. Next year the club won its first and only international title, the 1999 Copa CONMEBOL (the precursor of the current Copa Sudamericana) against CSA from Brazil.

The following season, Talleres' good performance in first division qualified the team to play the 2001 Copa Mercosur and the 2002 Copa Libertadores, being the first and only team from Córdoba to qualify for those continental tournaments. Talleres reached the round of 16 in the Mercosur, only to lose against Gremio. In Copa Libertadores, Talleres had a poor performance, being eliminated in the first stage.

Despite finishing in third place during the Torneo Clausura tournament of the 2003–04 season and qualifying for the Copa Libertadores again, Talleres was relegated, due to poor results in the previous 2 seasons, after losing to Argentinos Juniors in the promotion/relegation play-off. By Argentine rules, the team lost its Libertadores bid because of this.

In 2008–09 Talleres was dismissed again, this time to the Torneo Argentino A via the point average system despite finishing in 12th place of 20 teams in Primera B Nacional.

On 15 November 2010, the IFFHS produced a report on the top 200 teams in the American continent from 2001 to that date. Talleres was No. 130, the highest position for a Córdoba Province team in the ranking.

In May 2013, Talleres was promoted to Primera B Nacional after defeating San Jorge by 1–0. Later, Talleres returned to the third division but it was promoted in 2015, and, in 2016, after 12 years Talleres earned the promotion to First Division.

In 2019, Talleres played once again the Copa Libertadores. In 2021, Talleres played Copa Sudamericana. After a very good performance in Copa Argentina, in which "la T" reached the final, and the national league, in which it finished in the third position, Talleres returned to Copa Libertadores for the next year.

Talleres made its best performance yet at 2022 Copa Libertadores, by reaching the Quarter-finals However, the poor performance at the national league left the club with no international participations for 2023. For the second year in a row, Talleres was runner-up in Copa Argentina, losing the final 0-1 to Patronato.

Presidents

 (1913) - Thomas Lawson
 (1914) - Cipriano Sánchez
 (1915) - Adolfo Hannel
 (1916 - 1917) - Enrique France
 (1918) - Romulo Canale
 (1919) - Enrique Guillaume
 (1920) - Juan Finlay
 (1921) - Thomas Lawson
 (1922) - Enrique Guillaume
 (1923) - Juan Carlos O'Brien
 (1924) - Antonio Estela
 (1925 - 1926) - Félix Bottini
 (1927) - Enrique France
 (1927) - César Pieri
 (1928) - Alfredo Barissone
 (1929) - Juan Dellacua
 (1930) - Abel Pereyra
 (1931) - Alberto Bernis Sales
 (1932) - Miguel Tobler
 (1933 - 1936) - José León Chercoles
 (1937) - Miguel Tobler
 (1938) - Francisco Pérez Maciel
 (1939 - 1940) - Miguel Tobler
 (1941 - 1942) - Ángel Peralta
 (1943) - Luis Zapata
 (1944 - 1946) - Carlos Molina
 (1947 - 1950) - Edgardo Pérez Cortés
 (1951 - 1952) - Félix Curtino
 (1953) - Enrique Carratala
 (1954 - 1955) - Félix Curtino
 (1956 - 1957) - Aníbal Grecco
 (1958 - 1959) - Pedro Ballester
 (1960 - 1961) - Vicente Rossella
 (1962) - Arturo Carrasco Gómez
 (1963) - Edgardo Álvarez Vocos
 (1964) - Félix Curtino
 (1965) - Alfredo Arocena
 (1966) - Edgardo Álvarez Vocos
 (1967 - 1968) - Rodolfo Berardo
 (1969) - Luis Teco
 (1970) - Abrahan Litvak
 (1971) - Avelino Guirales
 (1972) - Miguel Srur
 (1973) - Fernando Rencoret
 (1974 - 1986) - Amadeo Nuccetelli
 (1987) - Rogelio Egea
 (1988) - Miguel Macias
 (1989) - Egidio Heyd
 (1990 - 1991) - Bernabé Muttoni
 (1992) - Miguel Srur
 (1993) - Rafael Lascano
 (1994 - 1997) - Victor Szumik
 (1997) - Rolando Martin
 (1998 - 2004) - Carlos Dossetti
 (2004 - 2014) -  
 (2014 - present) - Andrés Fassi

Notes

Managers

 Leopoldo Ledesma (1929 - 1930)
 Emilio Manuel Fernández (1931 - 1932)
 Enrique Palomini (1933 - 1936)
 Eduardo Ponce (1937 - 1938)
 Luis Santiago Bustos (1938)
 Enrique Palomini (1938 - 1940)
 Eduardo Ponce (1941)
 Rodolfo Bútori (1942 - 1946)
 Osvaldo Sella (1947)
 Máximo Disandro (1947 - 1948)
 Ramón Bresolí (1949 - 1950)
 Rodolfo Bútori (1951 - 1952)
 José Bútori (1952)
 Leopoldo Ledesma (1952)
 Domingo Carunchio (1952)
 Atilio Garlatti (1953 - 1954)
 Máximo Disandro (1954)
 Rodolfo Bútori (1955)
 Ramón Bresolí (1956)
 Máximo Disandro (1957)
 Amable Rubén López (1957)
 Rodolfo Bútori (1958 - 1959)
 Pedro Gordillo (1959)
 Atilio Willington (1959 - 1961)
 Fernando Belucci (1962)
 Rodolfo Bútori (1962 - 1963)
 Amable Rubén López (1963 - 1964)
 Rodolfo Bútori (1965)
 Atilio Willington (1965)
 Eduardo Pereyra (1966)
 Fernando Belucci (1967)
 Domingo Boero (1967)
 Héctor Burgos (1968)
 Hipólito Toledo (1969)
 Miguel Ponce (1970 - 1971)
 Augusto Fumero (1971)
 Nicolás Campos (1972)
 Miguel Antonio Romero (1972)
 Llamil Simes (1972)
 Miguel Ponce (1973)
 Ángel Labruna (1974)
 Adolfo Pedernera (1975)
 Humberto Taborda - Gualberto Mugione (1976)
 Rubén Bravo (1976)
 Roberto Marcos Saporiti (1977 - 1979)
 José Omar Pastoriza (1980)
 Vicente Rodríguez (1981)
 Humberto Taborda (1981)
 Ángel Labruna (1981 - 1983)
 Daniel Willington (1983)
 Miguel Ángel Oviedo (1983)
 Alfio Basile (1983)
 Humberto Maschio (1984)
 José Omar Reinaldi (1984 - 1986)
 Pedro Marchetta (1986)
 Humberto Taborda (1986)
 Héctor Baley - Miguel Oviedo (1986)
 Sebastián Viberti (1986 - 1987)
 José Omar Reinaldi (1987 - 1988)
 Roberto Saporiti (1988 - 1989)
 Eduardo Luján Manera 1990)
 Miguel Ángel Oviedo (1990)
 Daniel Willington (1990)
 Miguel Ángel Oviedo (1990 - 1991)
 Julio Correa (1991)
 Eduardo Manera (1991)
 José Omar Pastoriza (1992 - 1993)
 Humberto Grondona (1993)
 Salvador Ragusa (1993)
 Miguel Antonio Romero (1993)
 José Manuel Ramos Delgado (1993 - 1994)
 Daniel Willington (1994)
 Fernando Areán (1994)
 Roberto Saporiti (1995)
 José Omar Reinaldi (1995)
 Humberto Taborda (1995 - 1996)
 Osvaldo Sosa (1996)
 Ricardo Gareca (1996 - 1997)
 Humberto Zuccarelli (1997 - 1998)
 Ricardo Gareca (1998 - 2000)
 Juan José López (2000 - 2001)
 Ricardo Gareca (2001)
 Mario Zanabria (2001)
 Mario Ballarino (2001 - 2002)
 Enzo Trossero (2002)
 Marcelo Arce - Sergio Coleoni (2002)
 Sergio Batista (2002 - 2003)
 Ángel Bocanelli (2003)
 Luis Cubilla (2003)
 José Omar Pastoriza (2003)
 Horacio Cirrincione (2003)
 Juan José López (2004)
 Leonardo Madelón (2004)
 José Omar Reinaldi (2004)
 Daniel Willington - José Trignani (2005)
 Héctor Arzubialde (2005)
 Emilio Commisso (2005)
 Roberto Oste (2005)
 Roberto Saporiti (2006)
 Roberto Oste - Fabián Carrizo (2006)
 Ricardo Gareca (2007)
 Roberto Oste (2007)
 Salvador Capitano (2007)
 Rubén Darío Insúa (2007 - 2008)
 Carlos Bustos - Jorge Grassi (2008)
 Ángel Comizzo (2008)
 Humberto Grondona (2008)
 Juan Amador Sánchez (2009)
 Raúl Alejandro Peralta (2009)
 Roberto Saporiti (2009)
 Andrés Rebottaro (2010)
 Héctor Arzubialde (2010 - 2011)
 Gustavo Coleoni (2011)
 José María Bianco (2011)
 Héctor Chazarreta (2011)
 Arnaldo Sialle (2011 - 2013)
 Rubén Forestello (2014)
 Jorge Ghiso (2014)
[Sergio Coleoni - Mario Obulgen (2014)
 Ángel Hoyos (2014)
 Frank Darío Kudelka (2015 - 2018)
 Juan Pablo Vojvoda (2018 - 2019)
 Alexander Medina (2019 - 2021)
 Ángel Hoyos (2022)
 Pedro Caixinha (2022)
 Javier Gandolfi (2022-present)

Colours and badge

Colours
The C.A. Talleres colours are specified on club's statute, they are dark blue and white. Along its history, other colors have been used for alternate kits such as yellow, orange, bordeaux, grey, black, red, among others.

Badge
The badge has have more than 20 different designs on several records through 100 years of existence of the club, with no precise details about its shape or colors.

Stadium

Players

Current squad
.

Out on loan

Honours

National

League 
Primera B Nacional (2): 1997–98, 2016
Torneo Federal A (2): 2012–13, 2015

International
Copa Conmebol (1): 1999

Regional
 Liga Cordobesa de Fútbol (27): 1915, 1916, 1918, 1921, 1922, 1923, 1924, 1934, 1938, 1939, 1941, 1944, 1945, 1948, 1949, 1951, 1953, 1958, 1960, 1963, 1969, 1974, 1975, 1976, 1977, 1978, 1979

Friendly
Copa Hermandad (1): 1977

Records

All-time records 
 Victory:
 Primera División – 8–2 v Mariano Moreno in 1982.
 Primera B Nacional – 6–0 v Huracán Corrientes in 1997.
 En el Torneo Argentino A – 5–1 a Estudiantes de Río Cuarto en 2010.
 Copa Argentina – 4–1 v General Paz Juniors in 2011.
 Liga Cordobesa de Fútbol – 10–0 v Sportivo Belgrano in 1951.
 Defeat:
 Primera División – 0–12 v Argentinos Juniors in 1986.
 Primera B Nacional – 0–4 v Central Córdoba in 1993 and Almirante Brown in 2007.
 Torneo Argentino A – 1–5 v Guillermo Brown in 2011.
 Copa Argentina – 0–2 v Defensa y Justicia in 2016.
 Most goals scored overall – 163, Miguel Antonio Romero
 Most appearances overall – 502, Luis Galván
 Most goals scored on AFA tournaments – 75, Mario Bevilacqua
 Most appearances on AFA tournaments – 366, Miguel Oviedo
 Most goals scored on international tournaments – 5, Pablo Cuba
 Most appearances on international tournaments – 20, Mario Cuenca and Julián Maidana
 Goalkeeper's most unbeaten streak – 701 minutes, Guido Herrera

Other records 
 It has the fourth longest unbeaten streak worldwide.
 It has the third unbeaten streak in AFA tournaments, after Midland and Boca Juniors.
 Talleres won the 2016 Primera B Nacional unbeaten and it is the only team in Argentina that could achieve this performance.
 It is the only team in Córdoba that played Copa Libertadores.
 Along with Racing and Godoy Cruz, they are the non-porteños teams which had the best performance on Primera División, finishing in the 2nd place once each.
 It is the non-porteño team which contributed the most in giving players to the Argentina national football team for the FIFA World Cup.
 It has one of the biggest virtual communities of Argentina.
 There were attendances of more than 60000 people even in third division' matches.
 Along with América Mineiro, they are the only teams that were never defeated in an U-20 Copa Libertadores match.
 It reached the 36th position in the Club World Ranking.

References

External links

 

 
Association football clubs established in 1913
Football clubs in Córdoba Province, Argentina
Talleres
1913 establishments in Argentina
Railway association football teams
Copa CONMEBOL winning clubs